Albert's Place was a Canadian children's television series which aired on CBC Television in 1959.

Premise
The series featured stories and songs geared towards children, featuring the puppet Albert who lives in an attic where he had books, paints, trunks and other items. Other regulars included Robert Clothier who portrayed a handyman, with John Chappell (folk singer) and Nonie Stewart (story teller).

Production
Albert's Place was produced in Vancouver by Len Lauk.

Scheduling
The series was broadcast in a 15-minute time slot on Wednesdays at 5:00 p.m. (Eastern) from 1 July to 23 September 1959 as a mid-year programme.

References

External links
 
 

CBC Television original programming
1950s Canadian children's television series
1959 Canadian television series debuts
1959 Canadian television series endings
Black-and-white Canadian television shows
Canadian television shows featuring puppetry
Television shows filmed in Vancouver